Helen Marie Twelvetrees ( Jurgens; December 25, 1908 – February 13, 1958) was an American actress. She starred in Hollywood films in the sound film era from 1929 to 1939. Many of her roles were of "suffering women". She has a star on the Hollywood Walk of Fame.

Early life
Helen Marie Jurgens was born in Brooklyn, where she attended Public School 119. Her family moved to Flatbush, where her younger brother was born. In the winter of 1919, the family's four-bedroom apartment caught fire and her brother perished.

She attended Brooklyn Heights Seminary and then the Art Students League of New York, where she studied for a year before enrolling at the American Academy of Dramatic Arts. While attending AADA, she met actor Clark Twelvetrees, whom she married at age 19 in 1927. She adopted her husband's surname and used it as her professional name.

Career

With some stage experience, Twelvetrees went to Hollywood with a number of other actors to replace the silent stars who could not or would not make the transition to talkies. Her first job was with Fox Film Corporation, and she appeared in The Ghost Talks (1929). After three films with Fox, she was released from her contract. However, she was signed by Pathé shortly thereafter, and along with Constance Bennett and Ann Harding, Twelvetrees starred in several lachrymose dramas, not all of which were critically acclaimed. 

When Pathé was absorbed by RKO Radio Pictures, she found herself at various times miscast in mediocre films. With the arrival of Katharine Hepburn at RKO, Twelvetrees left the studio to freelance (Harding and Bennett would also subsequently depart).

The 1930 film Her Man set the course of Twelvetrees' screen career, and she was cast in a series of roles portraying suffering women fighting for the wrong men. Later she appeared with Spencer Tracy in Now I'll Tell (also known as When New York Sleeps); with Donald Cook in The Spanish Cape Mystery; and with Maurice Chevalier in Paramount's A Bedtime Story. She also starred in two Metro-Goldwyn-Mayer films, which prompted author John Douglas Eames to note that she "had a gift for projecting emotional force with minimal visible effort."

In 1936, Twelvetrees traveled to Australia to star in the Cinesound Studios production Thoroughbred, about the rise of a Melbourne Cup winning racehorse. The film was produced at Cinesound Studios in Bondi Junction. After filming completed, Twelvetrees returned home to Brooklyn, where she fell ill. After a slow recovery, she returned to acting in the USO production of The Man Who Came to Dinner. She made her final two films, Persons in Hiding and Unmarried, in 1939.

Twelvetrees left film in favor of summer stock and made her Broadway debut in Jacques Deval's Boudoir in 1941. The play folded after only 11 performances, and she largely retired after marrying for a third time. She continued to act occasionally, such as in the role of Blanche DuBois in A Streetcar Named Desire in summer stock in Sea Cliff, New York in August 1951. Fellow cast member Naomi Caryl recalled that Twelvetrees had "... the saddest eyes I'd ever seen" and "... it was also obvious that she had an extremely fragile psyche."

Personal life
Twelvetrees was married three times. She married her first husband, actor Clark Twelvetrees, in February 1927. During the marriage, her husband attempted suicide in the middle of a dinner party by jumping out of a Manhattan hotel window. He struck two awnings and then a parked taxi and was hospitalized for several months. In March 1930, she filed for divorce, citing mental cruelty. During the divorce trial, Twelvetrees claimed that her husband was an alcoholic who was drunk when they married and beat her on four occasions. Their divorce became final in March 1931. Clark Twelvetrees died in August 1938 of a skull fracture after striking his head on a curb when a man, who witnessed him hitting a woman with whom he was arguing, attempted to intervene.

Twelvetrees married again in April 1931 to Hollywood stuntman-turned-actor, real estate broker, and High-Sierra hunting and fishing guide Frank Woody. They had a son, Jack Bryan Woody, born in October 1932 (died 2016), who became a prominent USFWS wildlife biologist. She divorced Woody in 1936.

She married for a third and final time to farmer and Air Force captain Conrad Payne in 1947.  She spent her remaining years traveling around the world with her husband, who was stationed in the U.S. and Europe.

Death
On February 13, 1958, Twelvetrees was found unconscious on the floor of her living room at her home in Middletown, Pennsylvania, a suburb of Harrisburg, Pennsylvania. She was taken to Olmstead Air Force Base Hospital in Middletown, where she died. According to the county coroner, Twelvetrees had been suffering from a kidney ailment for some time and took an overdose of sedatives. Her death was ruled a suicide. 

Twelvetrees's remains were later cremated. Her funeral service was attended by only her widower and a close friend, Geraldine Uglow, who was also living on the base with her military husband. Her ashes were interred in a grave in Middletown Cemetery. The gravesite was left unmarked until January 2013, when her family placed a headstone.

For her contribution to the motion-picture industry, Twelvetrees has a star on the Hollywood Walk of Fame, located at 6263 Hollywood Boulevard.

In popular culture
The play I'm Looking for Helen Twelvetrees explores Twelvetrees' life through the eyes of an actor who saw her perform on Long Island. Parallels between Twelvetrees and the character whom she had played, Blanche DuBois, are explored.

Filmography

Further reading

References

External links

 
 
 
 
 Photographs of Helen Twelvetrees
 

1908 births
1958 suicides
20th-century American actresses
20th Century Studios contract players
Actresses from New York City
American Academy of Dramatic Arts alumni
American film actresses
American stage actresses
Art Students League of New York alumni
Burials in Pennsylvania
Drug-related suicides in Pennsylvania
People from Flatbush, Brooklyn
WAMPAS Baby Stars